Hebron is a census-designated place in South Lebanon Township, Lebanon County, Pennsylvania, United States. As of the 2010 census the population was 1,305. The Lebanon County Prison is located within the CDP.

Geography
Hebron is in central Lebanon County, along the northern edge of South Lebanon Township. It is bordered to the north and west by the city of Lebanon, the county seat, and to the east by unincorporated Avon.

The area drains north to Quittapahilla Creek, the main stream through Lebanon, flowing west to Swatara Creek, part of the Susquehanna River watershed.

Demographics

References

Census-designated places in Lebanon County, Pennsylvania
Census-designated places in Pennsylvania